67th Division or 67th Infantry Division may refer to:

 67th Division (Imperial Japanese Army)
 67th Rifle Division, a Soviet division
 67th Guards Rifle Division, a Soviet division
 67th (2nd Home Counties) Division, a British division in World War I
 67th Infantry Division (United States), an unorganized World War II division

See also
 67 Squadron (disambiguation)
 67th Regiment (disambiguation)